FSC Rybinsk was a Russian football team from Rybinsk. It played professionally in 1964–1973, 1976–1995 and 2001–2002. Their best result was winning their zone of the Soviet Second League in 1968, 1969 and of the Russian Second Division in 1993 (they did not advance to the second-highest level on those occasions because there was an additional tournament for zone winners that they did not win in 1968 and 1969 and because Russian league system was re-organized in 1994).

Team name history
 1937–1946: FC Krylia Sovetov Rybinsk
 1946–1957: FC Krylia Sovetov Shcherbakov (Rybinsk was renamed temporarily)
 1957–1963: FC Krylia Sovetov Rybinsk
 1964–1984: FC Saturn Rybinsk
 1984–1989: FC Saturn Andropov (Rybinsk was renamed temporarily)
 1989–1991: FC Saturn Rybinsk
 1992–1996: FC Vympel Rybinsk
 1997–1998: FC Burlak Rybinsk
 1999–2000: FC SKA-Zvezda Rybinsk
 2001–2006: FC Rybinsk
 2007–2008: FSC Rybinsk

External links
  Team history at KLISF

Association football clubs established in 1937
Association football clubs disestablished in 2009
Defunct football clubs in Russia
Sport in Yaroslavl Oblast
Rybinsk
1937 establishments in Russia
2009 disestablishments in Russia